LGCA may refer to:
Lesbian and Gay Community Appeal Foundation
Lattice gas cellular automaton
U.S.-Israel Loan Guarantee Commitment Agreement